The Chanchlani Global Health Research Award is a Canadian health sciences award that recognizes a world leading scholar in the area of Global Health. Each year a discipline within Global Health (i.e. Determinants of Health, Policy Development, and Innovative Solutions) is chosen by the internal review committee at McMaster University. The review committee then selects the leading researcher based on interview and impact in the field. The award recipient receives a monetary prize of $5,000 and opportunity to present their research findings to researchers and students.

The award provides opportunities for informal scientific exchanges between the scientist/scholar and faculty, postdoctoral fellows, graduate and undergraduate medical students. The award was created by the Chanchlani Family through $1 Million endowment along with a $250,000 donation at the McMaster University in 2012.

Award recipients 

Source: McMaster University
2019: Dr. Camara Phyllis Jones, Tools for Achieving Healthy Equity: Allegories on "Race" and Racism
2018: Dr. Dariush Mozaffarian
2017: Dr. John Ioannidis, Improving Research Practices: A Global Challenge
2016: Dr. Vikram Patel, The Black Dog: Why We Don’t Care

2015: Professor Dr. Ab Osterhaus, Head of the Department of Virology of the Erasmus MC Rotterdam

2014: Dr. Hans Rosling, PhD, MD, Professor of International Health, Karolinska Institute

2012: Dr. Madhukar Pai MD, PhD, Associate Professor of Epidemiology, McGill University, The freakonomics of TB control in India and Dr. Nikika Pant Pai, MD, MPH, PhD, Associate Professor of Medicine, McGill University, Point-of-care tests for HIV: innovation, synergy and impact (joint awards)

See also

 List of medicine awards
 List of awards named after people

References

Medicine awards
Research awards
Awards established in 2012
Canadian awards